The Berenstain Bears is an Australian-American animated comedy television series based on Stan and Jan Berenstain's Berenstain Bears children's book series, produced by Southern Star Productions. It aired in the United States from September 14, 1985, until March 7, 1987, on CBS with 52 11-minute episodes in 26 half-hour shows produced.

Series overview

Episodes

Season 1 (1985–1986)

Season 2 (1986–1987)

Notes

Lists of Australian animated television series episodes
Lists of American children's animated television series episodes
Berenstain Bears